Edward Solomon Ayensu was born in Sekondi in Western Region of Ghana on 28 August 1935. He is an international development advisor on science, technology and economic development.

Education 
Ayensu obtained his doctorate from the University of London, and was appointed a visiting fellow at Wolfson College, Oxford University.

Career 
He is currently the chairman of the Presidential Advisory Council on Science, Technology and Innovation (PACSTI) Ghana, chairman of the board of trustees of the African Institute for Mathematical Sciences (AIMS) Ghana, chairman of the board of trustees of the Accra Institute of Technology (AIT) and president of the Energy Globe Foundation. He was formerly chairman of the World Bank Inspection Panel; chairman of the Council for Scientific and Industrial Research (CSIR) Ghana; senior advisor to the president and director of Central Projects Department, African Development Bank and president of the Pan-African Union for Science and Technology. He was a director and senior scientist during his 20 years at the Smithsonian Institution, Washington D.C. He was also formerly member of the board of trustees of the UN University for Peace, member of the advisory board of the Sustainable Forestry Management Limited (SFM) and secretary-general of the International Union of Biological Sciences and he is the founding chairman of the African Biosciences Network.

Honours and recognition 
In addition to being a Fellow of the Ghana Academy of Arts and Sciences, he is a Foreign Fellow of the India National Sciences Academy, Fellow of TWAS Academy of Sciences for the Developing World, Founding Fellow of the African Academy of Sciences and Fellow of the New York Academy of Sciences.

Publications 
He has travelled extensively the world over for field research in the biological sciences and workshops, meetings and conferences on environment and development; and as a consultant on science and technology for development especially in agro-industries, energy and mining in developing countries and the promotion of private sector initiatives in Africa.

Ayensu has authored many books and published numerous scientific and technical papers.  In 1997 he authored a book named Ashanti Gold. His very recently launched books – Lake of Life – is a commemorative volume depicting Volta River Authority's 50th Anniversary and a Field Guide to the Volta Basin.

Personal life 
His mother, Grace Ayensu was a member of parliament during the first republic. A prolific writer and photographer.

References

External links
 https://www.edwardayensu.com

Living people
Ghanaian economists
Ghanaian scientists
Foreign Fellows of the Indian National Science Academy
Year of birth missing (living people)
Fellows of the Ghana Academy of Arts and Sciences
Fellows of the African Academy of Sciences
Founder Fellows of the African Academy of Sciences